James Arthur McKnight (June 1, 1936 – February 24, 1994) was an American professional baseball player whose career lasted for 18 seasons (1955–1972).

The native of Bee Branch, Arkansas, signed with the St. Louis Cardinals in 1955 and spent 5 seasons in the Cardinals' farm system without getting into an MLB game.  On June 15, 1960, he was traded by St. Louis to the Cubs for veteran outfielder Walt Moryn.  After spending much of the rest of the season with the Cubs' Houston Buffs Triple-A affiliate, he made his Major League Baseball debut in September, going 2-for-6 in three games. McKnight returned to the Buffs in 1961 and set personal bests for home runs (24) and runs batted in (102), then spent the entire  on the roster of the MLB Cubs.  In 60 games that season, 50 as a pinch hitter, McKnight collected 19 hits, including one triple, with six runs scored and five runs batted in.

He was traded to the Milwaukee Braves during the off-season, and spent ten additional seasons in minor league baseball, including six with the Phoenix Giants of the Pacific Coast League.

In 1972, he managed the Decatur Commodores of the Class A Midwest League and appeared in seven games as an active player.

All told, Jim McKnight appeared in 1,954 games as a minor leaguer.

McKnight died in an automobile accident at age 57 in Van Buren County, Arkansas.

His son Jeff McKnight was also a Major League Baseball player, an infielder who played in 218 MLB games for the New York Mets and Baltimore Orioles over six seasons (1989–1994), dying at age 52 on March 1, 2015, after suffering from leukemia for a number of years.

References

External links
Jim McKnight's career stats

1936 births
1994 deaths
Ardmore Cardinals players
Atlanta Crackers players
Baseball players from Arkansas
Chicago Cubs players
Decatur Commodores players
Denver Bears players
Gainesville G-Men players
Houston Buffaloes players
Houston Buffs players
Major League Baseball right fielders
Major League Baseball third basemen
Memphis Chickasaws players
Paducah Chiefs players
People from Van Buren County, Arkansas
Phoenix Giants players
Richmond Virginians (minor league) players
Road incident deaths in Arkansas
Rochester Red Wings players
San Diego Padres (minor league) players
Tacoma Giants players
Toronto Maple Leafs (International League) players
Tulsa Oilers (baseball) players